Madame Baptiste is a 1974 French film directed by Claude Santelli.

Cast
 Isabelle Huppert - Blanche
 Francine Bergé - The mother
 Jean-Marc Bory - The father
 Roger Van Hool - Raoul Aubertin
 Christian Bouillette - Baptiste
 Laurence Février - Delphine
 Luce Fabiole - Céleste
 Françoise Thuries - The cousin
 Nadine Delanoë - The cousin
 Andrée Champeaux - The aunt
 Teddy Bilis - The doctor
 Gérard Dournel - The priest
 François Germain - The valet
 Martin Trévières - The fanfare chief

See also
 Isabelle Huppert on screen and stage

References

External links

1974 films
French television films
1970s French-language films
Films directed by Claude Santelli
1970s French films